Thrupp, a variant of the Middle English word thorp, meaning hamlet or small village, and may refer to:

People
 Arthur Thomas Thrupp (1828–1889), English Royal Navy officer
 Darren Thrupp (born 1966), Australian Paralympic athlete
 Dorothy Ann Thrupp (1779–1847), English writer
 Frederick Thrupp (1812–1895), English sculptor
 George Athelstane Thrupp (1822–1905), English coach builder
 John Thrupp (1817–1870), English historian
 Joseph Francis Thrupp (1827–1867), an English churchman and academic

Places in the United Kingdom
Thrupp, Gloucestershire, a village and civil parish in Stroud District
Thrupp, Oxfordshire, a hamlet near Kidlington in Cherwell District